Snow Mountain is a mountain located in Oxford County, Maine, about  south of the Canada–United States border with Québec. Snow Mountain is flanked to the north by Kennebago Divide Mountain, and to the south by Twin Mountains and West Kennebago Mountain.

Snow Mountain stands within the watershed of the upper Androscoggin River, which drains into Merrymeeting Bay, the estuary of the Kennebec River, and then into the Gulf of Maine. The west end of Snow Mtn. drains into Snow Mountain Brook, then into the Cupsuptic River, Cupsuptic Lake, through a series of lakes into the Rapid River and Umbagog Lake, the source of the Androscoggin River. The south side of Snow Mtn. drains into the East Branch of the Cupsuptic River. The northeast and northwest sides of Snow Mtn. drain into Wiggle Brook, then into the Kennebago River and Cupsuptic Lake.

References

See also 
 Snow Mountain
 List of mountains in Maine
 New England Hundred Highest

New England Hundred Highest
Mountains of Oxford County, Maine
Mountains of Maine